The 1945 Colorado Buffaloes football team was an American football team that represented the University of Colorado as a member of the Mountain States Conference (MSC) during the 1945 college football season. Led by Frank Potts in his third and final season as head coach, the Buffaloes compiled an overall record of 5–3 with a mark of 3–1 in conference play, placing second in the MSC.

Schedule

References

Colorado
Colorado Buffaloes football seasons
Colorado Buffaloes football